Exellia is a genus of extinct spadefish that lived in the Tethys Ocean during the early Paleogene.  The adult form is shaped akin to a large spadefish or a short dolphinfish, with very large pelvic fins, and a long dorsal fin starting from in front of the eyes to near the base of the caudal peduncle. The juvenile form resembles a juvenile drumfish, with the dorsal fin forming a long crest on top of the head.

The earlier species, E. proxima, is known from the Danata Formation Lagerstätten from the Late Paleocene of Turkmenistan.  The latter-occurring species, E. velifer, is the better studied species, and is known from numerous adult and juvenile specimens from the Middle Eocene Monte Bolca Lagerstätten.

Most researchers regard Exellia as a spadefish, though, some remove this genus, and the related Eoluvarus to a separate family, "Exelliidae."

References

Exelliids
Prehistoric ray-finned fish genera